Waterbury Airport , is located in Plymouth, Connecticut, United States.

Facilities and aircraft
Waterbury Airport is situated four miles north of the central business district, and contains two runways.  The longer runway, 17/35, is turf measuring 2,005 x 135 ft (611 x 41 m).

For the 12-month period ending December 31, 2007, the airport had 15,695 aircraft operations, an average of 43 per day: 99% local general aviation, and <1% transient general aviation. At that time there were 14 aircraft based at this airport: 71% single-engine, 14% glider airplanes, and 14% ultralight.

References

External links
 

Plymouth, Connecticut
Airports in New Haven County, Connecticut
Waterbury, Connecticut